ROCS Chi Kuang (PFG2-1105) is a  guided missile frigate of the Republic of China Navy, used mainly in local air-defense and anti-submarine roles.

Construction and career 
Laid down on 4 October 1992 and launched on 27 September 1993, Chi Kuang was commissioned in service on 7 March 1995. All of these Taiwanese FFGs have the length of the later Oliver Hazard Perry FFGs, but have a different weapon and electronics fit.

See also

References

Cheng Kung-class frigates
Ships built in the Republic of China
1993 ships
Frigates of the Republic of China